John Young is an Australian naturalist and cinematographer.

Early life
John Young grew up on a farm for cattle and sheep in New South Wales.
As a boy, he began egg-collecting with his brothers as a hobby.
While in his twenties, Young held several jobs, including as an electrician, truck driver, and a fencer.

Career
In the 1990s, Young created John Young Wildlife Enterprises.
The company ran birding tours and also produced wildlife films with the aim of documenting rare species of birds.

Blue-fronted fig parrot controversy

In 2006, Young claimed to have photographed a putative new species of parrot in southern Queensland, calling it the blue-fronted fig parrot. A forensic expert suspected that some colour of the bird's plumage had been altered, changing its brow from red to blue. Young maintained that he did not alter the colours, stating that he only lightened or darkened parts of the images. He said that he had deleted the original photographs of the bird which were requested by the forensic expert.

Night parrot controversy

In 2013, Young reported that he had sighted and photographed the night parrot, an endangered Australian bird. Live night parrots had not been definitively documented since 1912, though two dead ones were found in 1991 and 2006. However, the appearance of mesh in one of Young's photos raised questions as to how he was able to get pictures and videos of such a secretive bird. Young denied that he captured the individual, which would have been illegal.

In 2016, Young was hired as a senior biologist for the Australian Wildlife Conservancy (AWC). He resigned from his position in September 2018.

In 2019, the Australian Wildlife Conservancy published a report determining that some of Young's supposed observations were not credible. They determined that night parrot calls recorded by Young at Kalamurina Sanctuary were the result of playing publicly available call files near the detector rather than calls from an actual bird. Experts determined that an alleged night parrot nest photographed by Young contained fake eggs made of plaster or clay.

As a result of their report, the AWC also retracted Young's findings related to the buff-breasted buttonquail, another endangered Australian bird.

Documentaries
Ghosts of the Forest (2001)
The Kingfishers (2004)
John Young and the search for the red goshawk (2004)
Kingdom of the Jabiru (2004)
Rainforest: a musical journey through an Australian rainforest (2004)
Owls (2004)
Birds of Prey Part 1 (2005)
Birds of Prey Part 2 (2006)
Shadows in the desert: unearthing the secrets of the desert (2006)
Wings of silence (2006)

References

Australian naturalists
Australian cinematographers
Living people
Year of birth missing (living people)
Birdwatchers
Egg collectors